Joji is a Japanese singer and songwriter who has released three studio albums, one mixtape, two extended plays and fourteen singles, with three of those projects released under the name "Pink Guy", a comedic alter-ego created on the entertainment platform YouTube.

His debut studio album as Joji, titled Ballads 1, was released on 26 October 2018 and was his second project under the name, with the first being the In Tongues extended play. After a delay of several months, Joji released his second studio album Nectar on 25 September 2020. Joji's third studio album Smithereens was released on November 4, 2022, and was preceded by the singles "Glimpse of Us" and "Yukon (Interlude)".

As Joji

Studio albums

Extended plays

Singles

As lead artist

As a featured artist

Other charted and certified songs

Guest appearances

Remixes

As "Pink Guy"

Studio albums

Extended plays

Mixtapes

Other charted songs

Music videos

As lead artist

As featured artist

Production

2017
Pink Guy - Pink Season
01. "Hot Nickel Ball on a Pussy"
02. "Are You Serious"
03. "White Is Right"
04. "I Have a Gun" (performed by Politikz)
06. "STFU" 
07. "Gays 4 Donald"
08. "I Do It for My Hood"	 	
09. "Please Stop Calling Me Gay"
10. "She's So Nice"
11. "Please Stop Touching My Willy"
12. "Uber Pussy"
13. "セックス大好き" (Sekkusu Daisuki, "I Love Sex")
15. "Meme Machine"
16. "Hand on My Gat" (performed by Politikz)
17. "D I C C W E T T 1"
18. "Flex Like David Icke"
19. "High School Blink193"
20. "Rice Balls"
21. "Dora the Explora"
23. "Dog Festival Directions"
24. "We Fall Again"
25. "Club Banger 3000"
26. "Help"
27. "Hentai"
30. "Another Earth"
31. "I Will Get a Vasectomy"
32. "Furr"
33. "Fried Noodles"
34. "Goofy's Trial"
35. "Be Inspired"

Joji - In Tongues
01. "Will He"
02. "Pills"
03. "Demons"
04. "Window"
05. "Bitter Fuck"
06. "Worldstar Money (Interlude)"
07. "Plastic Taste"
08. "I Don't Wanna Waste My Time"

2018
Rich Brian, Kris Wu, Joji, Trippie Redd and Baauer
 "18" 

Lil Toe
 "Pipe Down"

88rising - Head in the Clouds
04. "Peach Jam" (performed by Joji and BlocBoy JB) 
17. "Head in the Clouds" (performed by Joji) 

Joji - Ballads 1
01. "Attention"
02. "Slow Dancing in the Dark" 
04. "Wanted U"
06. "Yeah Right"
08. "No Fun" 
10. "R.I.P." (featuring Trippie Redd) 
11. "XNXX" 
12. "I'll See You in 40"

2019
Higher Brothers - Five Stars
14. "Zombie" (featuring Rich Brian)

2020
Joji - Nectar
05. "Upgrade" 
06. "Gimme Love" 
07. "Run" 
12. "Normal People" (featuring Rei Brown) 
13. "Afterthought" (with Benee) 
14. "Mr. Hollywood"

2021
James Blake - Friends That Break Your Heart
02. "Life Is Not the Same"

Notes

References 

Discographies of Japanese artists